Synthetic Metals is a peer-reviewed scientific journal covering electronic polymers and electronic molecular materials.

Abstracting and indexing 
Synthetic Metals is abstracted and indexed in the following services:

According to the Journal Citation Reports, the journal has a 2020  impact factor of 3.266. It has published several highly cited papers (1 with ~1000 citations; 5 with >600 citations; 30 with >200 citations, according to Web of Science); most of them are devoted to conductive polymers (especially polyaniline) and one to optical properties of carbon nanotubes (see Kataura plot).

References

External links
 

Elsevier academic journals
English-language journals
Semi-monthly journals
Publications established in 1985
Materials science journals